Sigo Siendo Yo (I'm Still Myself) is a greatest hits album by Marc Anthony released in 2006. Unlike previous Marc Anthony compilations, this album features songs from the albums Marc Anthony to Valió La Pena. Therefore, this compilation album does not contain songs from his RMM years. The album also contains two original songs. Que Precio Tiene el Cielo was awarded Tropical Airplay of the Year in the 2007 Latin Billboard Music Awards.

Track listing

Charts

Weekly charts

Year-end charts

Sales and certifications

See also
List of number-one Billboard Tropical Albums from the 2000s

References

Marc Anthony compilation albums
Albums produced by Sergio George
2006 greatest hits albums
Spanish-language compilation albums
Sony BMG Norte compilation albums